George Daniel Bârlădeanu (born 19 February 1988) is a Romanian football player who plays as a midfielder for Liga III side Sporting Liești.

Honours
Oțelul Galați
Liga III: 2020–21

External links

1988 births
Living people
Romanian footballers
Association football midfielders
Liga I players
Liga II players
Liga III players
FCM Dunărea Galați players
FC Unirea Urziceni players
FC Politehnica Iași (1945) players
FCV Farul Constanța players
ASC Oțelul Galați players
Sportspeople from Galați